Richard Philpott (7 February 1813 – 8 June 1888) was an English cricketer who played for Victoria, Australia. He was born in West Farleigh and died in Brenchley.

Philpott made a single first-class appearance for the side, during the 1850–51 season, against Tasmania. From the middle order, he scored 12 runs in the first innings in which he batted, and a single run in the second.

External links
Richard Philpott at CricketArchive 

1813 births
1888 deaths
English cricketers
Victoria cricketers
Melbourne Cricket Club cricketers
People from West Farleigh
English emigrants to Australia
People from Brenchley